Hubert Airy (June 14, 1838 – June 1, 1903) was an English physician who was the pioneer in the study of a migraine.  He was the son of Sir George Airy, Astronomer Royal. He has two portraits in the National Portrait Gallery.

He was one of the first to describe the common visual aura, which is the second stage in an outbreak of a migraine attack and precede a headache, and also coined the term Scintillating scotoma for it.

References

1838 births
1903 deaths
Hubert